The 2014–15 Professional Football League was the third highest division in Russian football. The Professional Football League is geographically divided into 5 zones.
The winners of each zone are automatically promoted into the National Football League. The bottom finishers of each zone lose professional status and are relegated into the Amateur Football League.

West

Standings

Top scorers
Source: pfl-russia.com 
20 goals
Vladimir Obukhov (Spartak-2)
19 goals
Ivan Lukyanov (Tekstilshchik)
18 goals
Aleksei Medvedev (Saturn)
17 goals
Aleksei Yevseyev (Zenit-2)
16 goals
Ramil Sheydayev (Zenit-2)
13 goals
Maksim Kazankov (Domodedovo/Saturn)
10 goals
Anton Shishayev (Pskov-747)

Center

Standings

Top scorers
Source: pfl-russia.com 
17 goals
Mikhail Biryukov (Fakel Voronezh)
14 goals
Nikita Zhdankin (Ryazan)
10 goals
Igor Boyarov (Vityaz Podolsk)
Sergei Chernyshov (Lokomotiv Liski)
Artemi Maleyev (Avangard Kursk)
9 goals
Roman Grigoryan (Tambov)
Dmitri Kortava (Metallurg Lipetsk)
8 goals
Nikita Andreev (Tambov)

South

First round

Group 1

Group 2

Second round

Group A

Group B

Top scorers
Source: pfl-russia.com 
14 goals
Magomed Guguyev (Spartak Nalchik)
13 goals
Vladimir Lobkaryov (Torpedo Armavir)
12 goals
Aleksei Domshinskiy (Druzhba)
Atsamaz Burayev (Alania)
Artyom Serdyuk (Torpedo Armavir)
10 goals
Sergei Serdyukov (Dynamo GTS)
Semyon Sinyavskiy (Chernomorets)
Sergei Sechin (FC Astrakhan)
Stanislav Vaniyev (Vityaz)

Ural-Povolzhye

First round

Second round

Group A

Group B

Top scorers
Source: pfl-russia.com 
11 goals
Ruslan Galiakberov (Rubin-2 Kazan)
8 goals
Pavel Shadrin (Rubin-2 Kazan)
Dmitri Otstavnov (Neftekhimik / Rubin-2 Kazan)
Denis Uryvkov (Chelyabinsk)

East

Standings

Top scorers
Source: pfl-russia.com 
9 goals
Konstantin Maltsev (Yakutiya/Metallurg Novokuznetsk)
Yevgeni Shcherbakov (Dynamo Barnaul)
Dmitri Galin (Baikal)
8 goals
Anton Kiselyov (Metallurg Novokuznetsk)
7 goals
Eduard Krug (Dynamo Barnaul)
Viktor Sergeyev (Sibir-2)

References

External links
  Official site 
  Website of the Department of Professional Football of the Russian Football Union (DPF RFS)
  2014–15 season (comprehensive). RSSSF

2014-15
3
Rus